List of lakes of Washington may refer to:

 List of lakes of Washington (state)
 List of lakes of the Washington, D.C., area